"Ramblin' Gamblin' Man" is a song written and performed by Bob Seger (as the Bob Seger System). The song was originally released as a single in October 1968, then as a track on the album of the same name in April 1969. The single fared well, reaching No. 17 on the national charts. The original studio version, released in mono, had been unavailable to the public until it was included on Seger's compilation album Ultimate Hits: Rock and Roll Never Forgets (2011). It was Bob Seger's first top 20 hit.

Production
The song follows a I-♭VII-IV-I progression, a typical 1960s chord progression. The melody plays over a basic rock drum beat and an unmistakable organ riff that carry throughout the song. Seger's friend Glenn Frey, who later founded The Eagles, played acoustic guitar and sang back-up vocals.

Eagles drummer Don Henley said of it "It’s not really all that great a song, but your voice makes it sound like a great song."

Classic Rock History critic Janey Roberts rated it as Seger's 8th best song, saying that "it was the song that introduced the world to the iconic voice that would eventually become a rock and roll legend."

Live
The Bob Seger System synched to this song on a 1960s television show called Happenin''', hosted by Paul Revere. Seger continued playing the song in concert with many various bands long after the Bob Seger System disbanded. A live version of the song from an Orlando concert on May 13, 1973 exists on www.worj.com. This version features Seger's (apparently unreliable) "Borneo Band", with prominent female vocalist Shaun Murphy (then known as Stoney).  Another live version appeared on the live album Live Bullet (1976), this time with the Silver Bullet Band backing Seger. The song finally dropped off of Seger's set list in 1983, but returned 23 years later during Seger's 2006-07 Face The Promise tour.

Other versions
Recorded by Black Oak Arkansas for their album Balls of Fire (1976) and by Sammy Hagar for his album Sammy Hagar & Friends (2013), "Ramblin' Gamblin' Man" has also been performed in concert by such acts as Gov't Mule, The Black Keys, The Guess Who and Bruce Springsteen.

In popular culture
The song was used in the adventure comedy Joe Dirt (2001), Quentin Tarantino's movie and soundtrack for Once Upon a Time in Hollywood'' (2019) and in episode 3 of season 4 of the series The Grand Tour.

Chart performance

References

1968 singles
Bob Seger songs
Songs written by Bob Seger
1968 songs
Capitol Records singles